The Light may refer to:

Film 
 The Light (1919 film), a 1919 film directed by J. Gordon Edwards
 The Light (film), a 2004 French film (original title: L'équipier)
 The Light: Swami Vivekananda, a 2013 Indian film by Utpal Sinha

Music
The Light (producers), a trance music production duo
The Light (Glass), a 1987 symphonic composition by Philip Glass
The Light (Afrika Bambaataa album), 1988
The Light (BGYO album), 2021
The Light (Spock's Beard album), 1995
"The Light" (BGYO song), 2021
"The Light" (Common song), 2000
"The Light" (Disturbed song), 2015
"The Light" (Spock's Beard song), 1995
The Light, a 2008 album by Reinxeed
"The Light", a song by Adam Lambert on his 2015 album The Original High
"The Light", a song by Mason Jennings on his 2000 album Birds Flying Away
"The Light", a song by Supreme Beings of Leisure on their 2008 album 11i
"The Light", a song by Alesha Dixon on her 2009 re-release of The Alesha Show
"The Light", a song by Metronomy on their 2019 album Metronomy Forever
Peter Hook and the Light, English rock band

Other
"The Light" (Stargate SG-1), an episode in the science fiction series Stargate SG-1
The Light (Leeds), a shopping and leisure complex on The Headrow in Leeds City Centre, Leeds, England 
The Light (newspaper), a British conspiracy newspaper 
The Light, a video game development team responsible for the game Rex
An-Nur (The Light), 24th sura of the Qur'an
Secret Society of Super Villains or "The Light", in the Young Justice animated universe
The Light, an alternative name for the Assiniboine chief Wi-jún-jon
The Light (drug), Dipropyltryptamine (DPT, synthetic designer drug and entheogen taken as sacrament)

See also
The Lights, American rock band
The 'Lights, American TV show
Light (disambiguation)